Bryan Price (born November 13, 1986) is an American former professional baseball pitcher. He played in Major League Baseball (MLB) for the Cleveland Indians.

Career

Boston Red Sox
Price was drafted by the Boston Red Sox in the first round of the 2008 Major League Baseball Draft out of Rice University.

Cleveland Indians
He was traded from the Red Sox to the Cleveland Indians for Víctor Martínez on July 31, 2009. He was added to the team's 40-man roster on November 20, 2013. Price made his major league debut on September 1, 2014. He gave up a home run to Miguel Cabrera in his first game.

Price decided to retire rather accept a demotion from Columbus Clippers to the AA Akron RubberDucks.

References

External links

1986 births
Living people
Sportspeople from Corpus Christi, Texas
Baseball players from Texas
Major League Baseball pitchers
Cleveland Indians players
Rice Owls baseball players
Lowell Spinners players
Greenville Drive players
Salem Red Sox players
Kinston Indians players
Akron Aeros players
Columbus Clippers players
Peoria Javelinas players
Bravos de Margarita players
American expatriate baseball players in Venezuela
Akron RubberDucks players